Šumice (Serbian for "smallwood") may refer to:

Šumice (Uherské Hradiště District), a municipality and village in the Czech Republic
Šumice (Belgrade), a park and an urban neighborhood of Belgrade, Serbia
Šumice (Višegrad), a village in the municipality of Višegrad, Bosnia and Herzegovina
alternative name of Gornje Livade, Novi Sad, an urban neighborhood of Novi Sad, Serbia